Charles Montague may refer to:

Charles Edward Montague (1867–1928), English journalist and author
Charles Montague Bakewell (1867–1957), American professor and politician
Charles Montague Cooke (1849–1909), businessman in the Kingdom of Hawaii
Charles Montague Cooke Jr. (1874–1948), American malacologist
Charles Montague Ede (1865–1925), Hong Kong businessman and politician
C. Montague Shaw (Charles Montague Shaw, 1882–1968), Australian actor

See also
Charles Montagu (disambiguation)